Saint Anthony Air Station (ADC ID: N-26) is a closed General Surveillance Radar station. It was closed in 1968.

History
The site was established in 1953 as a General Surveillance Radar station, funded by the United States Air Force, one of the many that would make up the Pinetree Line of Ground-Control Intercept (GCI) radar sites.

It was used initially by the Northeast Air Command 921st Aircraft Control and Warning Squadron, which was activated.  It was equipped with the following radars:
 Search Radars: AN/FPS-3C, AN/FPS-502, AN/FPS-20A, AN/FPS-93A
 Height Radars:  AN/TPS-502, AN/FPS-6B

As a GCI base, the 921st's role was to guide interceptor aircraft toward unidentified intruders picked up on the unit's radar scopes. These interceptors were assigned to the 64th Air Division at Goose AFB, Labrador.

The station was reassigned to the USAF Air Defense Command on 1 April 1957, and was given designation "N-26". In 1963, the site was connected to the Semi Automatic Ground Environment (SAGE) Direction Center (DC-31) at Goose AFB.

In addition to the main facility, Saint Anthony operated an AN/FPS-14 manned Gap Filler site:
 La Scie Air Station    (N-26B):  (Det 2 921st AC&W)

N-26B was built in 1957 about 150 km southeast of the main station and was closed in 1961. The town of La Scie, located about 5 km to the southwest provided living facilities to Detachment 2.

The 921st AC&WS squadron was inactivated on 18 June 1968, and Saint Anthony AS was closed on 30 June.  Today the site remains intact. It apparently has been unused and abandoned since its closure, some have been reduced to concrete foundations only.

USAF units and assignments 
Units:
 921st Aircraft Control and Warning Squadron, Activated at Grenier AFB, New Hampshire, 26 May 1953
 Transferred to Saint Anthony Air Station, Northeast Air Command, 1 October 1953
 Reassigned to Air Defense Command, 1 April 1957
 Discontinued 18 June 1968

Assignments:
 64th Air Division (NEAC), 1 October 1953
 4731st Air Defense Group, 1 April 1957
 Goose Air Defense Sector, 6 June 1960
 37th Air Division, 1 April 1966 – 18 June 1968

See also
 List of USAF Aerospace Defense Command General Surveillance Radar Stations

References

  A Handbook of Aerospace Defense Organization 1946 - 1980,  by Lloyd H. Cornett and Mildred W. Johnson, Office of History, Aerospace Defense Center, Peterson Air Force Base, Colorado
 Winkler, David F. (1997), Searching the skies: the legacy of the United States Cold War defense radar program. Prepared for United States Air Force Headquarters Air Combat Command.

Installations of the United States Air Force in Canada
Radar stations of the United States Air Force
Military installations in Newfoundland and Labrador
1953 establishments in Newfoundland and Labrador
1968 disestablishments in Newfoundland and Labrador
Military installations closed in 1968
Military installations established in 1953